Macomb Intermediate School District (MISD) is a coordinating school district based in Clinton Township, Michigan. The district serves local school districts in Macomb County, primarily through the providing of special education support, services and screening of students. The MISD operates several schools of its own to educate the more seriously impaired children.

References

External links
 

Intermediate school districts in Michigan
School districts in Michigan
Education in Macomb County, Michigan